Montenegrin women's team was founded in 2012. It is organised and headed by Football Association of Montenegro.
Montenegro played first official match on 13 March 2012 in Bar, against Bosnia and Herzegovina (2:3). Best competitive result, Montenegro made at 2013–14, when they qualified for the final round of 2015 FIFA Women's World Cup qualification (UEFA).

List of matches
The following matches were played or are scheduled to be played by the national team in the current or upcoming seasons.

Head-to-head record
Below is a list of performances of Montenegro women's national football team against every single opponent.

Last update: March 2021.

See also
Montenegro women's national football team
Montenegrin Women's League
Montenegrin Cup (women)
Football Association of Montenegro
Football in Montenegro

External links
Official website
FIFA profile

Montenegro women's national football team
Women's national association football team results